Notion Magazine is a newsstand music magazine and fashion magazine published quarterly in the United Kingdom, founded in 2004.

About 
Notion was co-founded by Billy Hussein, alternatively known as Billy Notion. Notion's team is headed up by Nicholas Douglas (director). Contributors to the magazine also write for other publications including The Guardian, Drowned In Sound, Pop Justice and The Huffington Post.

The magazine has an established 'Introducing' section featuring up-and-coming artists alongside new music and fashion stories. The centre section of the magazine includes longer music features, notably in-depth interviews with established artists and fashion editorials. The last section of the magazine is devoted to culture and one-off features.

Artists to have been previously featured on the cover include Demi Lovato, Miley Cyrus, Pharrell Williams, Adam Lambert, Lindsay Lohan, Ariana Grande, Joey Badass, The Weeknd, Bastille, Bruno Mars, Jessie J, Pixie Lott and Carly Rae Jepsen. The current cover stars of Notion Magazine are Niall Horan, Rita Ora, Future, Clean Bandit and Mabel.

Notion Magazine is distributed around newsstands including WHSmith, as well as independent retailers around the United Kingdom. Notion Magazine is available for purchase online and shipped internationally.

Online & Other Platforms
Notion Magazine also has its website counterpart, which bridges the gap between its quarterly issues, running daily fashion, music and culture features and articles. Notionmagazine.com provides a platform for emerging and established artists to share news instantaneously. The website also runs stories digitally alongside the quarterly printed issues.

In November 2018, the website underwent an extensive relaunch with the URL changing to notion.online.

References

External links
 

2004 establishments in the United Kingdom
Bi-monthly magazines published in the United Kingdom
Music magazines published in the United Kingdom
Magazines established in 2004